The Eagle Lake Tramway is a historic timber-transport mechanism in the remote North Maine Woods in northeastern USA.  The tramway, built in 1902 and operated until 1907, transported timber across a neck of land between Eagle Lake and Chamberlain Lake, with one end eventually becoming the eastern terminus of the Eagle Lake and West Branch Railroad in 1927.  The remnants of the tramway and rail station were listed on the National Register of Historic Places as the Tramway Historic District in 1979.  The tramway is part of the Allagash Wilderness Waterway, a Maine state park.

Description and history
The remote northern interior of Maine was in the 19th-century developed as a major logging region.  Because the provincial government of New Brunswick began charging tariffs for timber floated down the Saint John River, American logging interest sought ways to divert timber into the Penobscot River watershed.  This was accomplished by the placement of dams in a number of places on Chamberlain Lake and Eagle Lake, whose waters historically reached the Saint John via the Allagash River, which resulted in their waters' diversion toward Webster Lake (now in the far north of Baxter State Park), part of the Penobscot watershed.  By the late 19th century the lock dam between Chamberlain and Eagle Lakes had become a hindrance to logging operations.

To speed the movement of timbers between the two lakes, the ingenious solution of a cable-drawn steam-powered tramway was implemented. The tramway was rendered obsolete by the invention of the Lombard Steam Log Hauler, and ceased operation in 1907. Prior to the tramway, oxen hauled wood between Eagle and Chamberlain Lakes.

In 1927 the Eagle Lake end of the tramway was adapted as the eastern terminus of the Eagle Lake and West Branch Railroad, a freight-only operation for hauling timber southward. The railroad operated until 1933; the only major surviving element of its operation are two locomotives, which are vandal-stripped and exposed to the elements.  Of the tramway, the cable and elements of its tracks survive, collapsing into the ground as the ties deteriorate, and elements of the steam power plant remain at Chamberlain Lake.

The area is now part of the Allagash Wilderness Waterway, a  Maine state park.

In 2012, part of the tramway was restored by volunteers.

See also
National Register of Historic Places listings in Piscataquis County, Maine

References

Transportation buildings and structures in Piscataquis County, Maine
Defunct Maine railroads
Maine logging railroads
North Maine Woods
Industrial buildings and structures on the National Register of Historic Places in Maine
Buildings and structures completed in 1902
Historic districts on the National Register of Historic Places in Maine
National Register of Historic Places in Piscataquis County, Maine